Andrew Mark Marcus (born March 29, 1985 or 1986) is a Canadian worship musician. He has released five studio albums, Salvation and Glory (2007), Emptiness Speaks Volumes (2009), Our Conversation Behind the Veil (2011), When Winter Falls Summer Springs (2013) and Constant (2016).

Background and early life
Marcus was born, Andrew Mark Marcus, on March 29, 1986, in Vancouver, British Columbia, Canada, as Andrew Mark Marcus, the son of Egyptian Christian immigrants, who has an older sister. He graduated from North Surrey Secondary School in 2003 or 2004 before beginning his career as a traveling worship leader at the age of 19, in 2004 or 2005. He attended college at Trinity Western University, studying business, eventually getting a youth pastors job at a new church plant in Okanagan, P.C Church, a church of the Pentecostal tradition, when he was 21-years-old in 2007. He learned pastoral theology, while he was enrolled at Christ for the Nations Bible College. He went on from Okanagan to Langley, British Columbia, where he was involved in worship at Christian Life Assembly. Marcus currently is the worship and creative arts pastor at Coquitlam Alliance Church, in Coquitlam, British Columbia.

Music history
Marcus has released four independent studio albums, the first being, Salvation and Glory in 2007. His next three releases were Emptiness Speaks Volumes, in 2009, Our Conversation Behind the Veil, in 2011, and When Winter Falls Summer Springs, in 2013. His first released with a major label, Constant, was released on July 29, 2016, from BEC Recordings.

Personal life
He got married on June 28, 2013 to his wife, Michelle.

Discography
 Salvation and Glory (2007)
 Emptiness Speaks Volumes (2009)
 Our Conversation Behind the Veil (2011)
 When Winter Falls Summer Springs (2013)
 Constant (2016)

References

External links

1985 births
1986 births
Living people
Canadian Christians
Musicians from Vancouver
People from Surrey, British Columbia